Westview is an unincorporated community in Stookey Township, St. Clair County, Illinois, United States.

References

Unincorporated communities in St. Clair County, Illinois
Unincorporated communities in Illinois